William Mitchell was an English footballer who played in The Football League for Blackburn Rovers.

Mitchell was a one-game wonder. He came into the Blackburn Rovers team for their last game of the 1888–1889 season, a home match at Leamington Road, Blackburn against Derby County. Mitchell scored the only goal of the 1st-half and, from a free-kick he scored Blackburn's 3rd. So he assisted Blackburn achieve 66 goals in 22 League games the 2nd highest of the season. Despite having made such an impact in one game Mitchell never played again and nothing else is known about him.

References

English footballers
Blackburn Rovers F.C. players
English Football League players
Association football forwards
Year of birth missing